Caladenia quadrifaria, commonly known as the large pink fingers orchid is a plant in the orchid family Orchidaceae and is endemic to New South Wales. It is a ground orchid with a single, sparsely hairy leaf and up to three pale to bright pink flowers.

Description
The flowers are greenish-pink or brownish pink on their back where there are many glandular hairs. The sides of the labellum turn upwards and the tip is curled under. There are four to eight long teeth on each side of the labellum near its tip and four to six rows of large, club-shaped calli along its mid-line. Flowering occurs from August to November.

Taxonomy and naming
Caladenia quadrifaria  was first formally described in 1991 by David Jones and the description was published in Australian Orchid Research. It had previously been known as a variety of Caladenia carnea identified, but not described by Richard Rogers.

In 1999, David Jones also described Caladenia porphyrea but it has not been recognised by the National Herbarium of New South Wales as a separate species.

Distribution and habitat
The large pink fingers orchid occurs in coastal areas of New South Wales between Brunswick Heads and Lake Tabourie where it grows in forest on slopes and ridges.

References 

quadrifaria
Plants described in 1991
Endemic orchids of Australia
Orchids of New South Wales
Taxa named by David L. Jones (botanist)